The Centenary 1000 cycling race was a one-week road bicycle race over seven stages covering . The race was run in 1934 as part of the celebrations of the Centenary of Victoria. The race was originally conceived along the lines of the Dunlop Grand Prix, won by Hubert Opperman then aged 23, by 1h 20'  and the concept for the race was covering  with prizes exceeding £1,000, including a climb over Mount Hotham.

The race attracted the top riders from Australia and New Zealand as well as Frenchmen Paul Chocque and Fernand Mithouard and Italian Nino Borsari. The Australian riders included Opperman, Richard "Fatty" Lamb, Ossie Nicholson, Hefty Stuart, Ern Milliken, Horrie Marshall and Ken Ross. Also competing were riders who would come to prominence in the following years, including Alan Angus, Dean Toseland, Clinton Beasley and Bill Moritz. The only notable Australian absentee was Frankie Thomas who had been suspended for 18 months. Nicholson had been suspended for 12 months for interfering with a rider making a record attempt but was able to have the suspension lifted in time to ride.. Efforts were made to also have Thomas’ suspension lifted, but to no avail. The New Zealand riders were Harry Watson, who had finished 2nd in the 1927 Dunlop Grand Prix, Len Hill and Alby Ralston.

The championship title was won by Harry Cruise then aged 28, in 53 hours 50 minutes 32 seconds. As Mithouard did not finish stage 6, Cruise had a 3 minute margin going into the final stage and was able to maintain that margin, becoming the Australasian Road Champion. The handicap was won by D grade rider Ted Stubenrauch despite splintering a bone in his shoulder on stage 4.

Handicaps 
The major races in Australia at the time were conducted as handicap races, including the Warrnambool to Melbourne and Goulburn to Sydney. There was a push for the race to be run on “continental lines", that is as a scratch race. The compromise was a graded handicap, with 30 riders graded on scratch and similar numbers in each of the other grades. By way of comparison the handicaps for the 1933 Warrnambool to Melbourne had 21 handicaps of between 10 and 70 minutes.
The championship title was decided on aggregate time with bonus time deductions on each stage of 1' 30" for the fastest, 1' 00" for the second fastest and 0' 30" for the third fastest. The handicap title was to be determined by a complex point system, with 130 points for first through to 30 for 100th for most stages and the fifth stage to Omeo had an extra 20 points. The grade handicaps varied slightly from stage to stage as follows:

Prizes 
When the event was announced in April 1934, it was promoted as having prizes over £1,000. The prizes grew steadily as the date approached. Ultimately there was £820 for the Handicap, £635 for the Championship  The winner of the handicap and the championship each won £500 but the major difference between the two was that the handicap had prizes of £150 for 2nd down to £25 for 5th, while the championship only had a prize of £30 for 2nd and none for the lower places. There were small prizes for each stage together with prizes for town sprints. The scratch riders were even less likely to beat the handicap to win the town sprints. The richest stage was the mountainous fifth, with a pool of £140 on offer for the ride from Wangaratta to Omeo which included the climbs of Mount Buffalo, Mount St Bernard and Hotham Heights.

One condition of the race was that cycle traders were prohibited from offering a bonus or other inducement to competitors in the event of winning the race on his machine. It is not clear what this condition was meant to achieve and it did not stop cycle traders advertising the success of riders on their bicycles.

The size of the championship prize was at the instigation of Sidney Myer who gave a gold cup valued at 100 guineas to go with the £500 provided by the Centenary Council. Myer also donated £500 for the handicap winner.

Stages

Stage 1: Melbourne – Warrnambool
Stage 1 on Saturday 20 October 1934 was a fresh take on the traditional Warrnambool route of  being run in reverse direction from Melbourne to Warrnambool for only the second time. 107 riders started the race and all of them made it through to Warrnambool. Mithouard and Chocque both punctured, the later twice and Chocque was then involved in a collision before coming into Camperdown wrecking his bicycle which was replaced. Borsari had a slipping chain near Little River  but recovered to rejoin the A grade bunch, however Opperman's account of the stage was that the A grade riders rolled into Colac as a compact bunch, however they were sent away in straggling sections and without Borsari. Borsari again recovered and despite cramp in the legs he and Mithouard led into the Showgrounds at Warrnambool. Opperman states that publicity had been given to the finish of three laps on the track at Warrnambool only to find that the finish was half a lap after the entrance. The previous fastest time for this direction was 12h 53' 0" set by Jim Carpenter in 1895. This time was comfortably beaten, with the first riders completing the course in 6h 50' 35" and Horrie Marshall setting the fastest time of 6h 38' 05".

Stage 2: Warrnambool – Stawell
Just 8 of the 30 A Grade riders were together at the finish. In addition to punctures, there was a crash at a railway crossing a few miles from Penshurst involving Nicholson, Joe Buckley and Bill Brewer. Buckley broke his collar bone and had to abandon while Nicholson suffered a severe head injury, completing the stage despite suffering from concussion, but abandoning the race at Stawell. In the handicap race, Toseland and Hallett had a lead of 5 minutes of the rest of their group, with Toseland winning easily, well ahead of the A grade riders.

Stage 3: Stawell – Bendigo
Stage 3 was held on Tuesday 23 October 1934, covering . Given the strength of C and D Grade, their handicaps for this stage were reduced by 3 minutes. Chocque was in the lead at the Ballarat sprint when he was struck, causing him to crash, breaking his collarbone, forcing him to abandon. Despite the reduced handicap the C and D group were well in front, with J Savage finishing not only first, but also fastest, nearly 2 minutes up on A Grade. Stuart slipped his chain just a few miles from the finish, but managed to regain the group and won the sprint by inches.

Stage 4: Bendigo - Wangaratta
Stage 4 on Wednesday 24 October 1934 covered  was the first time in which an A Grade rider beat the handicap to finish first. The original 107 riders were down to 91 at the start, with 9 riders having dropped out overnight. The Argus described it as the perfect handicap with riders from each of the grades in the 29 riders at the finish for the 2 lap sprint around Wangaratta showgrounds. Stuart, who had been leading the championship, broke a pedal and lost more than half an hour. Mithouard won the stage and with Stuart out of contention, took the lead in the championship. It was a tough day for leaders as the handicap leader Stubenrauch broke his rear wheel in a fall at Benalla and had to wait over an hour for a replacement. Stubenrauch splintered a bone in his right shoulder, but was somehow able to continue the race.

Stage 5: Wangaratta - Omeo
The mountainous 5th stage on Thursday 25 October 1934 had been anticipated as the key stage of the race, covering  and including the climbs of Mount Buffalo, Mt St Bernard and Hotham Heights. Milliken suffered a puncture on Mount Buffalo and had to wait more than an hour for a spare wheel. It was reported that he was almost frozen and he abandoned the race.

The ride from Wangaratta to Mount Buffalo was not counted in either the championship or the handicap events so the overall standings remained as per Stage 4.

The Sporting Globe listed the times for the Mount Buffalo hill climb and reported that the time for the A Grade riders were affected by the storm becoming more severe by the time they reached the climb.

Omeo - Sale
The revised stage included what the Argus described as the most arduous climb ever attempted in Australia  being the climbs of Mt St Bernard and Hotham Heights as well as the increased distance of the stage, covering . Stuart did not start the stage. The stage was marred by numerous falls and punctures, which started on the descent from Mount Buffalo. Opperman's account of the stage included that "On the morning we left the Chalet the instructions to the riders were changed four times in half an hour. At first we were to be controlled down the hill, then the field were to be allowed to use their own discretion, and race down, and these instructions were cancelled and altered until no one felt sure exactly what was the case."

Of the roads, Mithouard said "The climbs over Mt. Hotham were not very severe, but the condition of the road, washed into a rutted surface with sharp- edged stones forming knife-like obstructions for several miles, was too bad to expect men and bicycles to race over. The heavy rains and storms damaged the roads to such an extent that it was almost impossible to ride them without mishap". Mithouard had punctures and falls, one of which injured his leg, broke a wheel and spent 15 minutes waiting for a replacement. At Omeo Mithouard was tired and distressed and his bike needed repair and he withdrew.

In addition to Mithouard there were numerous falls, including Jack Beasley, who fell into a flooded creek and had to be saved from drowning by another rider, Harry Woolrich and the New Zealander Len Hill had severe falls with Woolrich being put into the hospice at Hotham Heights, Borsari cut his hand and Opperman also cut his hand requiring stitches, which he refused until after the stage. The trio of Opperman, Angus and Morgan battled on to Sale, losing 27 minutes on the stage to Lamb. 

Over a long and arduous stage Bert Williams won by 18 minutes and was the only rider to finish in daylight.

The Sporting Globe again set out the times of each rider up the Mt St Bernard climb. Further there were valuable prizes on offer for the Alpine stage, which as it was not run in the intended manner had to be redistributed. While Omeo was no longer the end of a stage, the prizes were awarded to the riders as they entered the compulsory stop at Omeo.

Stage 7: Sale - Melbourne
After the difficulties of the previous two days, the final stage on Saturday 27 October 1934  
Opperman had injured his knee in a fall in stage 4 near Wangaratta and injured it again in a fall whilst descending from Mount Hotham. He attempted to finish the race, but was forced to abandon at Traralgon, said to be the first time Oppy had retired from a race.

In the handicap, there were just six points separating Stubenrauch and Toseland, pointing to an exciting finish. At Berwick Toseland lost a pin from his chain, lost contact with the bunch and lost his chance at the £500. For the second time in the race C Grade set the fastest time of the race, with Howden leading the bunch. Stubenrauch finished with the bunch to win the handicap, while Duffy's second place was enough to see him snatch 2nd in the handicap from Toseland. Toseland had an impressive race in that, riding from C grade, he finished 9th in the championship, beating all of the B grade riders.

In the championship Cruise had a few minutes lead over Watson and stayed in the safety of the bunch, keeping out of trouble in the sprint around Como Park.

One indication of how hard the race was can be found in ride of Alan Angus. On stage 6 he finished with Opperman, losing some 27 minutes to Lamb. That was still enough however for Angus to finish in 6th place in the championship.

Notes

References

Cycling events in Victoria
1934 in Australian sport
1934 in road cycling